Garrocho is a Spanish surname with probable origin in Huelva in southwestern Spain.

The surname Garrocho in Spain 
At the moment the surname Garrocho is distributed by all Spanish geography but mainly:
Huelva 
Palos de la Frontera (Province of Huelva)
Sevilla
Morón de la Frontera (Seville)

Outside Spain the surname is also distributed in Argentina, Mexico and Brazil with the Garrocho Family in states of Minas Gerais and Paraná.

External links 
Surname distribution in Spain

Surnames